("Our Best") is a television series shown in German public television (ZDF) in November 2003, similar to the BBC series 100 Greatest Britons and that program's spin-offs.

In subsequent years, a dozen similar rankings were compiled, mostly titled the "favourite (topic) of the Germans", with topics including books, places, songs, actors, comedians, sports persons (extra list for football players), inventions, and TV broadcasts (extra list for Olympic games).

Greatest Germans 
The intention initially was to find out "Who are the greatest Germans?" (Wer sind die größten Deutschen?), with more rankings to follow later. The German public was allowed to vote (via postcard, SMS or Internet) for the most important Germans—historical or contemporary—from a list of more than 300 people, plus additional suggestions.

This pre-determined list of candidates was created for two reasons:
to exclude controversial figures from certain eras of German history, like Adolf Hitler and Erich Honecker;
to decide beforehand who was to be considered as "German" in the first place, due to the complications of German history and its changing frontiers, which could have excluded such people as Mozart and Romy Schneider (Austria) or Albert Schweitzer (France).

However, the inclusion of Nikolaus Kopernikus, who spoke and wrote German, in the list of scientists caused controversy in Poland where he is revered as a national hero – the Polish Senate declared him an "exceptional Pole" on 12 June 2003. Similarly the inclusion of Mozart and Freud was criticized in Austria.

For the final Top Ten, an additional round was held, in which each candidate was promoted by an "ambassador" (most of them journalists) that would explain the work and importance of his or her favourite.

 Guido Knopp for Konrad Adenauer
 Margot Käßmann for Martin Luther
 Gregor Gysi for Karl Marx
 Alice Schwarzer for die Geschwister Scholl, Sophie and Hans Scholl
 Friedrich Nowottny for Willy Brandt
 Götz Alsmann for Johann Sebastian Bach
 Peter Sodann for Johann Wolfgang von Goethe
 Wolf von Lojewski for Johannes Gutenberg
 Helmut Markwort for Otto von Bismarck
 Nina Ruge for Albert Einstein

There was controversy over the televoting because of the high call charges associated with the programme.

The final list appeared as shown below (in descending order). Several rather unknown figures ranked relatively high, no doubt because of temporary popularity and organized votes from fan groups (#15), or in case of #125, just an entry by organized Internet forum members to honour one of their members.

Top 10

11–200

References

External links
 unserebesten.zdf.de at archive.org

Germany
Lists of German people
ZDF original programming
2003 German television series debuts
2003 German television series endings
German-language television shows
German television series based on British television series